Douglas Campbell, CM (11 June 1922 – 6 October 2009) was a Canadian-based stage actor. He was born in Glasgow, Scotland.

Acting career
Campbell's interest in the theatre began at London's Old Vic Theatre at age 17, where working as a stage hand he saw Tyrone Guthrie's production of King John. He first performed in the 1941 Old Vic touring productions of Medea and Jacob's Ladder.

He was invited to Canada in 1953 by Guthrie, who had just been appointed the first artistic director of the fledgling Stratford Festival of Canada. Campbell played Hastings in the opening production of Richard III in 1953, and King Oedipus in the stage and screen production of Oedipus Rex in 1954. He appeared many times at Stratford in the fifty years that followed, drawing great acclaim in the role of Othello in 1959, and in many appearances as Falstaff.

Campbell founded the Canadian Players in 1954, and was artistic director at the Guthrie Theater in Minneapolis from 1966 to 1967. He was awarded the Order of Canada on 17 April 1997. Campbell received a Governor General's Performing Arts Award, Canada's highest honour in the performing arts, in 2003.

Personal life

In 1947, Campbell married Ann Casson, actress and daughter of Sir Lewis Casson and Dame Sybil Thorndike. His children from that marriage are Dirk Campbell, television director; Teresa Padden who played Cordelia to his first King Lear, Tom Campbell, painter; Benedict Campbell, actor. In the late 1960s, Campbell developed a relationship with Moira Wylie, an actress and director, with whom his children Beatrice and Torquil Campbell were born. Beatrice Campbell is a stage manager at the Shaw Festival while Torquil Campbell is an actor and lead singer/songwriter of the indie rock band Stars. Casson, whom Campbell never divorced, died in 1990. He and Wylie married in 1993.

Campbell died at Hôtel Dieu hospital in Montreal, Quebec from complications of diabetes and congestive heart disease on 6 October 2009.

Filmography

Films

Television

References

External links
 
 
 
 An Interview with Douglas Campbell by TheatreMuseumCanada
 Order of Canada: Douglas Campbell
 A gloriously forthright, honest, full-blooded trouper (Globe and Mail obituary)
 Douglas Campbell at NorthernStars
 Obituary from The Guardian (United Kingdom) "A socialist, pacifist and vegetarian, he delighted audiences as Falstaff, a character who reflected perfectly his larger-than-life personality and capacity for enjoyment."
 On 28 July 2013 the City of Toronto unveiled DOUGLAS CAMPBELL LANE (https://web.archive.org/web/20131214023912/http://www.harbordvillage.com/laneways/lanewayinteractivemap.html).  It runs North from College (half block West of Spadina) and then turns West to join Robert Street.

1922 births
2009 deaths
Deaths from diabetes
20th-century British male actors
Male actors from Montreal
Canadian male film actors
Canadian male stage actors
Canadian male television actors
Members of the Order of Canada
Naturalized citizens of Canada
Male actors from Glasgow
Governor General's Performing Arts Award winners
British emigrants to Canada